The 2017 Campeonato Ecuatoriano de Fútbol Serie A (officially known as the Copa Banco del Pacífico Serie A for sponsorship reasons) was the 59th season of the Serie A.

Teams
Twelve teams competed in the 2017 Serie A season, ten of whom took part in the previous season. Aucas and Mushuc Runa were relegated from the Serie A after accumulating the fewest points during the 2016 season. They were replaced by Macará and Clan Juvenil, the 2016 Serie B winner and runner-up, respectively. Macará made their 31st top-flight appearance and their first return to the Serie A since 2013, while Clan Juvenil participated in their first top-flight appearance.

Stadia and locations 

Note: Table lists in alphabetical order.

a: Known as River Ecuador until the end of the first stage.

Personnel and kits

Managerial changes

First stage
The first stage began on January 29 and ended on July 9.

Results

Second stage
The second stage began on July 14 and concluded on December 9.

Results

Third stage
Delfín and Emelec qualified to the Finals (Third stage) by being the First stage and Second stage winners, respectively. The winners were the Serie A champions and earned the Ecuador 1 berth in the 2018 Copa Libertadores, and the losers were the Serie A runners-up and earned the Ecuador 2 berth in the 2018 Copa Libertadores. By having the greater number of points in the aggregate table, Delfín played the second leg at home.

Emelec won 6–2 on aggregate.

Aggregate table

Copa Sudamericana playoff
The Copa Sudamericana playoff was played between:
 LDU Quito (Aggregate table 4th best team not qualified for 2018 Copa Libertadores)
 Técnico Universitario (2017 Serie B champions)

The winners qualified for the 2018 Copa Sudamericana first stage.

LDU Quito won 5–4 on aggregate.

Top goalscorers

Source: FEF

References

External links
Official website 

Ecuadorian Serie A seasons
Campeonato Ecuatoriano de Fútbol Serie A
Serie A